John Schreiber may refer to:
 John Schreiber (baseball)
 John Schreiber (writer)